Fabiola Leoncia Martínez Martínez (born 16 June 1996) is a Nicaraguan footballer who plays as a midfielder for the Nicaragua women's national team.

Club career
Martínez has played for UNAN Managua in Nicaragua.

International career
Martínez capped for Nicaragua at senior level during the 2013 Central American Games and the 2014 Central American and Caribbean Games.

References 

1996 births
Living people
Nicaraguan women's footballers
Women's association football midfielders
Nicaragua women's international footballers
Central American Games silver medalists for Nicaragua
Central American Games medalists in football